Dream Keeper is an album by bassist Charlie Haden that was recorded in 1990 and released by Blue Note Records. The album was nominated for a Grammy Award for Best Large Jazz Ensemble Performance and was voted "Jazz album of the year" in Down Beat magazine's 1991 critics' poll. Haden, Carla Bley and Ray Anderson also placed first in that year's Acoustic Bass, Composer and Trombone poll categories, respectively.

This album is the first by Haden's Liberation Music Orchestra since The Ballad of the Fallen (1983).

Track listing 
1. "Dream Keeper" (Bley, Langston Hughes, Traditional) – 16:51
"Dream Keeper Part 1" (Bley)
"Feliciano Ama" (trad. from El Salvador)
"Dream Keeper Part II" (Bley)
"Canto del Pilon (I)" (trad. from Venezuela)
"Dream Keeper Part III" (Bley)
"Canto del Pilon (II)" (trad. from Venezuela)
"Hymn of the Anarchist Women's Movement" (trad. from Spanish Civil War)
"Dream Keeper Part IV" (Bley)
2. "Rabo de Nube"	(Silvio Rodríguez) – 5:23
3. "Nkosi Sikelel'i Afrika" (Enoch Sontonga) – 10:31
4. "Sandino" (Haden) – 6:39
5. "Spiritual" (Haden) – 8:59

Personnel 
 Tom Harrell – trumpet, flugelhorn
 Earl Gardner – trumpet
 Dewey Redman – tenor saxophone
 Joe Lovano – tenor saxophone, flute
 Branford Marsalis – tenor saxophone, flute
 Ken McIntyre – alto saxophone
 Ray Anderson – trombone
 Sharon Freeman – French horn
 Joseph Daley – tuba
 Juan Lazaro Mendolas – wood flute, pan flute
 Amina Claudine Myers – piano
 Mick Goodrick – guitar
 Charlie Haden – double bass
 Paul Motian – drums
 Don Alias – percussion
 Carla Bley – arranger, conductor
 The Oakland Youth Chorus, Elizabeth Min, director

References 

1991 albums
Blue Note Records albums
Charlie Haden albums
Carla Bley albums
Liberation Music Orchestra albums